Cristian Garín was the defending champion, having won the event in 2013, but decided not to compete.

Andrey Rublev won the title, defeating Jaume Antoni Munar Clar in the final, 6–2, 7–5.

Seeds

Main draw

Finals

Top half

Section 1

Section 2

Bottom half

Section 3

Section 4

External links 
 Main draw

Boys' Singles
2014